Events from the year 1958 in Jordan.

Incumbents
Monarch: Hussein 
Prime Minister: Ibrahim Hashem (until 6 May), Samir al-Rifai (starting 6 May)

Events

 Crisis in Jordan.

See also

 Years in Iraq
 Years in Syria
 Years in Saudi Arabia

References

 
1950s in Jordan
Jordan
Jordan
Years of the 20th century in Jordan